Bruno Roth (23 April 1911 – 21 April 1998) was a German racing cyclist. He won the German National Road Race in 1935. He also rode in the 1935 Tour de France.

References

External links
 

1911 births
1998 deaths
German male cyclists
Cyclists from Frankfurt
German cycling road race champions
20th-century German people